is a Japanese actress. She has won three Japanese Academy Awards: the 1994 Best Actress award for her performance in Rainbow Bridge (Niji no Hashi), and the 1992 awards for Best Supporting Actress and Best Newcomer for her performance as Seiko Kawashima in My Sons.

The drama starring in the 1990, Imouto yo in 1994, Pure in 1996 , and Virgin Road in 1997 were all hits and gained high ratings.

Filmography

Film

Television

Awards

References

External links
  
 

1970 births
Living people
Japanese film actresses
Actresses from Yokohama
Japanese television actresses
20th-century Japanese actresses
21st-century Japanese actresses